Allen L. Milgrom (born March 6, 1950) is an American comic book writer, penciller, inker and editor, primarily for Marvel Comics. He is known for his 10-year run as editor of Marvel Fanfare; his long involvement as writer, penciler, and inker on Peter Parker, The Spectacular Spider-Man; his four-year tenure as West Coast Avengers penciller; and his long stint as the inker of X-Factor. He often inks Jim Starlin's work. Milgrom is the co-creator of DC superhero Firestorm.

Early life 
Al Milgrom grew up in Detroit, Michigan and graduated from the University of Michigan in 1972.

Career 

Milgrom started his comics career in 1972 as an assistant for inker Murphy Anderson. During that period, Milgrom contributed to Charlton Comics' Many Ghosts of Doctor Graves, Star*Reach, and comics published by Warren Publishing and Atlas/Seaboard, before joining with Marvel. Milgrom also worked as a "Crusty Bunker" for Neal Adams' Continuity Associates in 1977.

At one point Milgrom lived in the same Queens apartment building as artists Walter Simonson, Howard Chaykin, and Bernie Wrightson. Simonson recalls, "We'd get together at 3 a.m. They'd come up and we'd have popcorn and sit around and talk about whatever a 26, 27 and 20-year-old guys talk about. Our art, TV, you name it. I pretty much knew at the time, 'These are the good ole days.'"

Milgrom came to prominence as a penciller on Captain Marvel from 1975 to 1977. He penciled the Guardians of the Galaxy feature in Marvel Presents, which was written by Steve Gerber and Roger Stern. Milgrom worked as editor at DC Comics from 1977 to 1978. While at DC, he co-created Ronnie Raymond, the original Firestorm, with writer Gerry Conway.

Milgrom was an editor for Marvel Comics beginning in 1979, and editing Marvel Fanfare for its full ten-year run (#1–60, March 1982–January 1992). As editor of The Incredible Hulk, he designed the costumes of the U-Foes. He drew The Avengers (1983–85), The West Coast Avengers (1985–88), Kitty Pryde and Wolverine (1984–85), Secret Wars II (1985–86) and wrote the Mephisto limited series (1987).

Milgrom wrote and drew The Spectacular Spider-Man #90–100 (1984–85), and The Incredible Hulk (1986–87). In 1991, he wrote a story arc for The Amazing Spider-Man and collaborated with Danny Fingeroth on The Deadly Foes of Spider-Man limited series.

Milgrom has been a prolific inker, working on most of Marvel's line. He served an eight-year stint as the inker of X-Factor in 1989–1997. He inked Ron Frenz on Thor in 1991–1993 and Thunderstrike from 1994 to 1995. Other series he has worked on include Captain America, Generation X, The Micronauts, and the Uncanny X-Men. Milgrom inked the limited series A-Next, J2, Marvel: The Lost Generation, and Thanos. Beginning in 1996, Milgrom completed his artistic journey on The Spectacular Spider-Man by inking the title until its cancellation in 1998.

In 2001 Milgrom was fired from his Marvel staff job when it was discovered he had added hidden slanderous comments against then Editor-in-Chief Bob Harras in the background of a page in the comic book Universe X Special: Spidey. Milgrom went on to freelance for Marvel, mostly inking Jim Starlin's work. He also started to work for Archie Comics on a regular basis, inking a variety of titles. Beginning in the early 2000s, Al Milgrom freelanced for DC again, providing inks for titles like Mystery in Space (vol. 2), Ambush Bug: Year None and Strange Adventures (vol. 3).

Awards 
In 2009, Cleburne: A Graphic Novel, written and pencilled by Justin S. Murphy and inked by Al Milgrom, was nominated for the Independent Book Publishers Association's Benjamin Franklin Awards. In 2016, Milgrom was nominated and tied for runner-up for the Inkwell Awards Special Recognition Award. In 2017, he was awarded an Inkwell Awards Special Recognition Award.

Personal life 
Milgrom married Judy Lewin (also from Detroit) in early 1979. They have a daughter, Rachel, and two sons, Ben and Josh.

In fiction
In the film Ant-Man, Scott Lang and his crew stay at the Milgrom Hotel, an homage to Al Milgrom.

Bibliography 
Work as inker, unless noted otherwise.

Archie Comics 

 Archie #518, 528, 545, 565, 620 (2002–2011)
Archie & Friends #65, 67, 69, 74, 97, 130, 153 (2003–2011)
Archie Digest #209 (writer/inker), #243 (2004–2008)
Archie's Double Digest  #159, 185, 207, 220, 228–229, 251, 282 (2005–2017)
Archie's Holiday Fun Digest #7 (2004)
Archie's Pals 'n' Gals Double Digest #92, 117, 126, 132, 135–137, 143 (2005–2010)
Archie 1000 Page Comics-Palooza oneshot (2014)
Betty #104 (2001)
Betty & Veronica #87, 165, 170, 207–208, 211–213, 216–219, 221–225, 232, 252 (1995, 2001–2011)
Betty & Veronica Digest #126, 133, 157, 161, 163, 183 (2002–2008)
Betty & Veronica Double Digest #112, 153, 159, 174–175, 180–181, 184, 216 (2003–2013)
B&V Friends Double Digest #274, 284 (2019–2020)
Jughead's Double Digest #97, 171, 177 (2003–2012)
Jughead with Archie Digest #188, 190, 194, 196 (2004)
Laugh Comics Digest #196 (2004)
Tales from Riverdale Featuring Archie & His Friends oneshot (2006)
Tales from Riverdale Digest #1, 4, 11, 38 (2005–2010)
Veronica #69, 72, 74, 124–125 (1997–1998, 2002)
World of Archie Double Digest #4, 7 (2011)

Atlas/Seaboard Comics
 Destructor #4 (1975)
 Morlock 2001 #1–2 (1975)
 Tiger-Man #3 (1975)
 Western Action #1 (1975)

Capstone Publishers 

 George Eastman and the Kodak Camera (artist, with Gordon Purcell) (2007)

Dark Horse Comics 

 Dark Horse Presents #109 (writer/artist) (1996)
Dark Horse Book of Monsters (2006)

DC Comics 

 1st Issue Special #11 (1976)
 Action Comics #462 (1976)
 Ambush Bug: Year None #1–5, 7 (2008–2009)
 Blackhawk #247 (1976)
 Cancelled Comic Cavalcade #1 (1978)
 DC Comics Presents: Superman #1 (2004)
 DC Universe: Legacies #6 (2010)
 Detective Comics #450–451 (Robin) (penciller), #460–461, 469–470 (Batman) (1975–1977)
 Doom Patrol vol. 5 #16 (2011)
 Firestorm #1–5 (penciller) (1978)
 Firestorm vol. 2 #100 (artist) (1990)
 Fury of Firestorm Annual #4 (artist) (1986)
 Hawkman Special #1 (artist) (2008)
 Heroes Against Hunger #1 (1986)
 House of Mystery #234 (artist), #277 (1975–1980)
 Isis #8 (1977)
 JLA #76 (2003)
 JLA: Classified #35 (2007)
 JSA #33 (2002)
 Kobra #4 (penciller, with Pat Gabriele) (1976)
 Legion #16, 25, 31 (2003–2004)
 Man-Bat #1 (1975)
 Mystery in Space vol. 2 #1–8 (2006–2007)
 Orion #18 (penciller) (2001)
 Power Company Josiah Power #1 (2002)
 Rann/Thanagar: Holy War #6 (2008)
 Richard Dragon, Kung-Fu Fighter #2 (1975)
 Sgt. Rock #303–304 (1977)
 Showcase #101–103 (Hawkman and Adam Strange) (penciller) (1978)
 Son of Vulcan #5 (2005)
 Strange Adventures vol. 3 #1–8 (2009)
 Superman #292 (1975)
 The Superman Family #182–183 (1977)
 Sword of Sorcery #5 (1973)
 Tom Strong's Terrific Tales #10 (2004)
 Unknown Soldier #234 (1979)
 World's Finest Comics #243 (1977)

DC Comics and Marvel Comics
 The Incredible Hulk vs. Superman #1 (1999)
 Iron Lantern #1 (1997)
 Speed Demon #1 (1996)

Image Comics
 Generation X/Gen¹³ #1 (1998)

Marvel Comics 

 A-Next #5–12 (1999)
 Adventures of Cyclops and Phoenix #4 (1994)
 Alpha Flight #58–62, 64–65 (1988)
 The Amazing Spider-Man #194, #195 (inker), #196 (penciller), #208–209, 218, 223 (inker), #353–358, #371–372 (writer), #376, 381, 384, 400, 402, 411, 415, 429, Annual #11 (inker) (1977–1997)
The Amazing Spider-Man vol. 2 #13 (2000)
 The Avengers #228–232, 234, 236–250 (penciller), #370 (inker), Annual #11, 22 (penciller), #23 (writer/artist) (1982, 1993–1994)
 Avengers Spotlight #21–25, 27–28, 30–34, 36 (Hawkeye) (penciller) (1989–1990)
 Avengers: The Ultron Imperative #1 (among others) (2001)
 Bizarre Adventures #32, 34 (writer/artist) (1982–1983)
 Bullwinkle and Rocky #2–9 (1988–1989)
 Cable #2–4, 10, 24 (1993–1995)
 Captain America #256 (inker), #260 (writer/inker), #340–357 (inker) (1981, 1988–1989)
 Captain Marvel #29 (inker), #37–42 (penciller), #43–45 (artist), #46–53 (penciller) (1973–1977)
 Captain Marvel vol. 3 #11, 17–18 (2000–2001)
 Crazy Magazine #68, 71 (artist) (1980–1981)
 Daredevil #241, Annual #5 (1987–1989)
 Darkdevil #1–3 (2000–2001)
 Deadly Foes of Spider-Man #1–4 (artist/penciller) (1991)
 Deadly Hands of Kung-Fu #1–4, 7–8 (1974–1975)
 Defenders #69, 94–95, 100–101, 104–108 (1979–1982)
 Doctor Strange #24–25 (penciller), #45–46 (inker) (1977, 1981)
 Excalibur #21–22, 25, 30–31, 35–36 (1990–1991)
 Factor-X #1–4 (1995)
 Fantastic Five #1–5 (1999–2000)
 Fantastic Four #208 (inker), #296 (penciller, among others), #348–350 (inker), #355 (artist), Annual #24 (writer/artist) (1979, 1986–1991)
 Fantastic Four vol. 3 #19 (penciller) (1999)
 Fantastic Four Roast #1 (artist, two pages) (1982)
 Fantastic Four: World's Greatest Comics Magazine #11 (penciller, among others) (2001)
 Flintstone Kids #1 (1987)
 Gambit and the X-Ternals #2–4 (1995)
 Generation X #11, 15–16 (1996)
 Ghost Rider #35 (penciller, with Jim Starlin) (1979)
 Ghost Rider vol. 2 #69, 87 (1996–1997)
 Ghost Rider/Wolverine/Punisher: Dark Design #1 (1995)
 Giant Size Defenders #1 (1974)
 Giant Size Spider-Man #2 (1974)
 Haunt of Horror #3 (1974)
 Hawkeye: Earth's Mightiest Marksman #1 (1998)
 Heroes for Hope Starring the X-Men #1 (among others) (1985)
 Howard the Duck #30–31 (1979)
 Hydrators #1–2 (promo) (penciller) (1999)
 The Incredible Hulk #320–324 (writer/penciller), #325–327 (writer), #329 (writer/penciller), #330 (writer/inker), #434–435 Annual #9–10, 2001 (inker) (1980–1981, 1986–1987, 1995, 2001)
 Infinity Abyss #1–6 (2002)
 Infinity Crusade #1–6 (1993)
 Infinity War #1–6 (1992)
 Iron Man #158 (1982)
 Iron Man/X-O Manowar: Heavy Metal #1 (1996)
 J2 #1–12 (1998–1999)
 Journey Into Mystery #512–513, 520–521 (1997–1998)
 Kitty Pryde and Wolverine #1–6 (artist) (1984–1985)
 Kull the Destroyer #13 (1974)
 Marvel Adventures #13 (1998)
 Marvel Comics Presents #1–4 (writer/artist), 15–17, 68, 70 (1988–1991)
 Marvel Comics Super Special #1 (Kiss) (1977)
 Marvel Fanfare #12 (artist), #20–21, 57, 59 (1985, 1991)
 Marvel Holiday Special #1–2 (1991–1992)
 Marvel Premiere #39–40 (Torpedo) (1977–1978)
 Marvel Presents #3–12 (Guardians of the Galaxy) (penciller, full art for #4) (1976–1977)
 Marvel Saga #1, 3 (1985–1986)
 Marvel Super-Heroes #5 (1991)
 Marvel Team-Up Annual #3 (Hulk/Power Man/Iron Fist) (1980)
 Marvel Team-Up vol. 2 #2 (1997)
 Marvel: The Lost Generation #12–1 (2000–2001)
 Marvel Treasury Edition #28 (Superman and Spider-Man) (background inks) (1981)
 Marvel Universe: The End #1–6 (2003)
 Master of Kung Fu #17–21 (inker), #23 (penciller), #24 (penciller, among others) (1974–1975)
 Mephisto vs. ... #1–4 (writer) (1987) 
 Micronauts #9–18 (1979–1980)
 Ms. Marvel #21 (1978)
 New Mutants #70, 84, Annual #6 (1988–1990)
 New Warriors Annual 2 (among others) (1992)
 Nightwatch #1–3 (1994)
 Nova vol. 3 #5 (1999)
 Psi-Force #6 (1987)
 Punisher #76 (1993)
 Punisher War Journal #12, 17–20, 24 (1989–1990)
 Questprobe #2 (Spider-Man) (writer/penciller) (1985)
 Red Sonja #13–14 (1979)
 Rocket Raccoon #3 (1985)
 Rom #18, 24 Annual #4 (1981–1985)
 Savage Hulk #1 (1996)
 Savage She-Hulk 24–25 (1982)
 Savage Tales #5 (Conan) (1974)
 Secret Wars II #1–9 (penciller) (1985–1986)
 Sensational She-Hulk #9–10 (1989)
 Sensational Spider-Man #25 (1998)
 Sergio Aragones Massacres Marvel #1 (among others) (1996)
 Solo Avengers #14–17 (Hawkeye) (penciller) (1989)
 Special Marvel Edition #15 (Master of Kung-Fu) (1974)
 The Spectacular Spider-Man #67, 69, 70, 72 (inker), #73, 75–79, 81–82, 85–89 (penciller), #90–96 (writer/penciller), #97–99 (writer), #100 (writer/penciller), #223, 231, 251–252, 258–263,  Annual #7, 13 (inker) (1982–1998)
 Spider-Man #26, 37 (1992–1993)
 Spider-Man: Chapter One #9–12 (1999)
 Spider-Man: Maximum Clonage Alpha #1 (1995)
 Spider-Man: Funeral for an Octopus #1–3 (1995)
 Spider-Man Unlimited #4 (1994)
 Spider-Man: The Parker Years #1 (1995)
 Spidey Super Stories #55 (artist, one page) (1981)
 Star Wars #17 (1978)
 Strange Tales #181 (Warlock) (1975)
 Star Trek: Deep Space Nine #1–7, 10–11, 14 (1996–1998)
 Star Trek: Voyager #9, 13–15 (1997–1998)
 Star Trek Voyager: Splashdown #1, 3–4 (1998)
 Tales from the Age of Apocalypse: Sinister Bloodlines #1 (1997)
 Thanos #1–12 (2003–2004)
 Thor #302, 308, 392, 430–459 Annual #14, 16 (1980–1981, 1988–1993)
 Thor vol. 2 # (2001)
 Thunderbolts #0, 42, '97 (1997–2000)
 Thunderstrike #1–6, 8–10, 12–24 (1993–1995)
 Toxic Avenger #4 (1991)
 Ultimate Spider-Man Super Special #1 (among others) (2002)
 Uncanny X-Men #292, 298, Annual #17 (1992–1993)
 Universe X Special: Spidey (2001)
 Untold Tales of Spider-Man #5–6, -1 (1996–1997)
 U.S. 1 #1–7  (writer) (1983)
 Venom: Lethal Protector #1–4 (1993)
 Venom: Funeral Pyre #1–2 (1993)
 Venom: The Madness #3 (1994)
 Venom: Nights of Vengeance #1–4 (1994)
 Venom: Tooth and Claw #1–3 (1996–1997)
 Warlock Chronicles #7 (1994)
 Web of Spider-Man #71, 91, 112, Annual #5 (1989–1994)
 West Coast Avengers #1–37, 39–40 (penciller, also writer for #30), Annual #2 (artist), #3 (penciller) (1985–1989)
 What If #25 (among others) (1981)
 What the--?! #1 (inker), #2 (writer) (1988)
 Wild Thing #1, 5 (1999–2000)
 Wolverine #29, 44, 76, 80, 84 (1990–1994)
 X-Factor #38–62, 71–104, 106–117, 119–129, 130, Annual #3, 5, 6, 8 (1988–1997)
 X-Force #25 (1993)
 X-Men Annual #2 (1993)
 X-Men: Prime #1 (1995)
 X-Men Unlimited #6 (among others) (1994)
 X-Men Vs. the Avengers #4 (1987)
 X-Terminators #1–4 (1988–1989)

Rampart Press 

 Cleburne: A Graphic Novel (2008)

Sitcomics 

Barbara Macabre's Morbid Museum #1.1 (artist) (2019)
Blue Baron Binge Book #3 (2020)

Star Reach 

 Star Reach #1–2 (1974–1975)

Texas Trio 

 Star-Studded Comics #8 (writer), #10 (inker/letterer) (1966–1967)

Totally Galactic Comics 

 Jetta Raye Adventures (penciller) (2020)

Warren Publishing 

 Eerie #48–50, 52–53 (writer) (1973–1974)

References

External links
 
 "DC Profiles #21: Al Milgrom at the Grand Comics Database
 Al Milgrom at the Lambiek Comiclopedia
 Al Milgrom at Mike's Amazing World of Comics
 Al Milgrom at the Unofficial Handbook of Marvel Comics Creators

1950 births
20th-century American artists
21st-century American artists
American comics artists
American comics writers
American graphic novelists
Artists from Detroit
Comic book editors
Comics inkers
DC Comics people
Living people
Marvel Comics people
University of Michigan alumni